Neshaminy School District is a school district headquartered in Middletown Township, Bucks County, Pennsylvania.

The district serves the eastern Pennsylvania municipalities of Middletown Township, Langhorne, Langhorne Manor, Penndel, Hulmeville, and Lower Southampton Township all in Bucks County. Students from the Middletown divisions of Levittown also attend these schools.

According to 2000 federal census data, it serves a resident population of 69,638. Per Neshaminy School District documents, as of January 2020 the Neshaminy School District provided basic educational services to 9,037 pupils. Full-day kindergarten in all elementary schools was added starting in the 2014–2015 school year.

The Neshaminy School District serves a large and diverse population. Students comprise many different racial, ethnic, and economic backgrounds. District residents represent a wide range from lower-middle-class to highly affluent.

History

The first public school in the area was established in Langhorne in 1836, and the District as it is known today was formed in 1950 by a conglomeration of smaller municipal districts.

Many Neshaminy facilities were constructed during the 1950s and 1960s following the development of the Levittown community at the southeast portion of the district. In 1975 a second high school was added (Maple Point) but was closed in 1982 and later converted into a middle school following a renovation project completed in 1993. Eisenhower Elementary School and Neshaminy Middle School were closed and the properties sold.

In June 2006, the Neshaminy School District began a massive $82 million renovation of Neshaminy High School, which was originally constructed as a combination high school and junior high school in the 1950s. Much of the original structure was demolished and completely rebuilt. The auditorium, 2 gymnasiums and circular library media center were all pre-existing but received extensive renovations. New classrooms, science labs, music rooms, tech education rooms, offices and common areas were added along with new parking lots and an expanded bus loading area.

In 2015 the district started a three-phase "Road Map" project to update older buildings, close three elementary schools to account for excess capacity (Heckman ES, Lower Southampton ES and Everett ES), and construct a new elementary school on the site of the old Tawanka Elementary School, which was demolished. Significant upgrades to several existing buildings (Sandburg MS, Poquessing MS, Ferderbar ES, Hoover ES, Miller ES and Schweitzer ES) were completed with funding from the federal Guaranteed Energy Savings Act including air conditioning, energy-efficient windows, roofing, lighting and other electrical upgrades. Additional upgrades included security features and online visitor registration kiosks. The final phase of the Road Map project was completed in August, 2017.

In September 2015 the fifth grade, formerly at elementary schools, was moved to middle schools.

Schools
The schools in the district are as follows; all elementary schools contain grades K–4, all middle schools contain grades 5–8, and Neshaminy High School contains grades 9–12.
Pearl S. Buck Elementary School
Joseph E Ferderbar Elementary School
Herbert Hoover Elementary School
Walter Miller Elementary School
Albert Schweitzer Elementary School
Tawanka Elementary School
Carl Sandburg Middle School
Poquessing Middle School
Maple Point Middle School
Neshaminy High School
Neshaminy School District Virtual Academy

Former schools:
Neshaminy-Maple Point High School - The district was overcrowding at Neshaminy High, then known as Neshaminy-Laghnore High School, and considered initial plans for a second high school. The proposed design was later reduced in size. In 1972 the board of trustees decided to build the new school; 5 voted in favor, and 4 voted against. Maple Point opened in 1975 and was built for $10,000,000. At the time of Maple Point's opening, the class sizes at Neshaminy-Langhore became smaller. There were people opposed to the new high school who called it a "Taj Majal" and argued that the board of trustees did not adequately manage demographic data. By 1982 there were proposals to convert it into a middle school.

References

External links
Neshaminy's official website
Neshaminy Federation of Teachers
Neshaminy Educational Support Professional Association
Bucks County Intermediate Unit
Neshaminy Education Foundation

School districts in Bucks County, Pennsylvania
School districts established in 1950